Betatetravirus is a genus of viruses, in the family Alphatetraviridae. Moths and  butterflies serve as natural hosts. There are seven species in this genus. Infection outcome varies from unapparent to lethal.

Taxonomy
The following species are assigned to the genus:
 Antheraea eucalypti virus
 Darna trima virus
 Dasychira pudibunda virus
 Nudaurelia capensis beta virus
 Philosamia cynthia x ricini virus
 Pseudoplusia includens virus
 Trichoplusia ni virus

Structure
Viruses in Betatetravirus are non-enveloped, with icosahedral geometries, and T=4 symmetry. The diameter is around 40 nm. Genomes are linear, around 6.5kb in length.

Life cycle
Viral replication is cytoplasmic. Entry into the host cell is achieved by penetration into the host cell. Replication follows the positive stranded RNA virus replication model. Positive stranded RNA virus transcription is the method of transcription. Translation takes place by ribosomal skipping. Moths and  butterflies serve as the natural host. Transmission routes are oral.

References

External links
 Viralzone: Betatetravirus
 ICTV

Alphatetraviridae
Virus genera